Shirebrook TMD was a traction maintenance depot located in Shirebrook, Derbyshire, England. The depot was situated on the freight-only line between Pye Bridge Junction and Shirebrook Junction, which is now part of the Robin Hood Line. The depot was on the east side of the line, adjacent to the closed Shirebrook West station.

The depot code was SB.

History 
At various times between 1966 and 2005, Class 08 shunters, Class 10, and Classes 20, 37, 47, 56 and 58 locomotives could be seen stabled at the depot.
The depot had an allocation of Class 08 shunters until 1988.

References

Bibliography 

 Railway depots in England
Rail transport in Derbyshire
Shirebrook